The 65th National Football Championship for Santosh Trophy 2010-11 was held in Assam, India, 6–30 May 2011. 31 teams were divided into eight clusters with last year's semi-finalists (West Bengal, Punjab, Tamil Nadu and Goa) directly finding their place in the Groups Quarterfinal round.

The Preliminary Round matches were held from 6 to 16 May, while the quarter final round matches took place from 17 to 24 May. The first semi-final was held on 26 May, while the second semi-final will be played on 27 May with grand finale being held on 30 May.

All together seven venues held the matches of the Santosh Trophy in Assam. Cluster I and V matches were played in Guwahati, Cluster II matches were played in Mangaldoi, Cluster III matches will be played in Shiv Sagar, Cluster V matches will take place in Tinsukia, while Cluster VI, VIII and VIII matches will be held in Nagaon, Bongaigaon and Kokrajhar respectively.

Clusters
Cluster I: Assam, Pondicherry, Rajasthan.
Cluster II: Chhattisgarh, Daman & Diu, Gujarat & Uttar Pradesh.
Cluster III: Manipur, Andhra Pradesh, Bihar & Andaman & Nicobar.
Cluster IV: Kerala, Jammu & Kashmir, Jharkhand, Chandigarh.
Cluster V: Karnataka, Uttarakhand, Services, Arunachal Pradesh.
Cluster VI: Delhi, Nagaland, Orissa & Himachal Pradesh.
Cluster VII: Mizoram, Haryana, Madhya Pradesh, Tripura.
Cluster VIII: Maharashtra, Meghalaya, Railways, Sikkim.

Preliminary level fixtures and points
Fixtures:
 Note - The first tie-breaker for teams finishing level on points is the head-to-head result between the teams concerned, followed by overall goal difference, and then overall goals scored.

Cluster I

Cluster II

Cluster III

Cluster IV

Cluster V

Cluster VI

Cluster VII

Cluster VIII

Second level rounds fixtures and points

Pre-Quarter-Finals

Quarter-finals

Group A

Group B

Semi-finals

Final

Final Result

References

San
2011